Blind Spot is a Canadian drama film, released in 2009. A collective film directed by Fabrice Barrilliet, Nicolas Bolduc, Julien Knafo and Marie-Hélène Panisset, the film centres on a group of friends who are undergoing personal crises as they enter their 30s.

The film's cast includes Daniel Parent, Hélène Florent, Erik Duhamel, Mario Saint-Amand, Maxim Roy, Sylvain Bissonnette, Judith Baribeau, Pierre-Olivier Fortier, Jean-René Ouellet, Karolyne Barrilliet, Vassili Schneider, Leanne Hebert-Nguyen, Vanessa Brown, Dominique Desrochers, Marianne Farley, Dominic Leblanc and Brigitte Paquette.

The film premiered at the Festival International du Film Francophone de Namur in October 2009, before going into theatrical release in 2010.

Knafo received a Jutra Award nomination for Best Original Music at the 13th Jutra Awards in 2011.

References

External links

2009 films
2009 drama films
Canadian drama films
Quebec films
French-language Canadian films
2000s Canadian films